Mihael Rebernik (born 6 August 1996) is a Croatian footballer who plays for Slovenian Second League side Nafta 1903 as a right-back.

Career

Rijeka
In January 2015, Rebernik signed a contract with HNK Rijeka in the 1. HNL. In his first two seasons with the club, he mainly featured for Rijeka II in the 3. HNL. On 15 May 2016, Rebernik made his official début for the first team, when he entered as a substitute in a home win against Istra 1961 in the final round of the 2015–16 Croatian First Football League.

Aluminij (loan)
On 19 July 2016, Rijeka sent Rebernik on a season-long loan to Aluminij in Slovenia.

Nafta 1903 and Zalaegerszegi TE
After two and a half seasons featuring for Nafta 1903 in Slovenia's second division, Rebernik was loaned, in January 2022, to their sister team, Zalaegerszegi TE, to play in Hungary's top tier until the end of the season.

References

External links
 
 
 Profile and statistics at Football Association of Slovenia 

1996 births
Living people
Sportspeople from Čakovec
Croatian footballers
Croatia youth international footballers
Association football fullbacks
Association football midfielders
NK Varaždin players
NK Međimurje players
HNK Rijeka players
HNK Rijeka II players
NK Aluminij players
NK Slaven Belupo players
NŠ Mura players
NK Nafta Lendava players
Zalaegerszegi TE players
Croatian Football League players
Slovenian PrvaLiga players
Slovenian Second League players
Nemzeti Bajnokság I players
Croatian expatriate footballers
Croatian expatriate sportspeople in Slovenia
Expatriate footballers in Slovenia
Croatian expatriate sportspeople in Hungary
Expatriate footballers in Hungary